Fariborz Maseeh (Persian: فریبرز مسیح : Farīborz Masīh) is an Iranian-born Iranian-American engineer who works in the field of micro-electro mechanical systems (MEMS). He founded IntelliSense in 1991 and sold it in 2000. He is the founder and managing principal of Surlamer LLC, an investment management firm managing investments in private companies, a diversified portfolio of commercial and residential real estate, and several proprietary traded hedge funds. He is the founder of Kids Institute for Development and Advancement (KiDA), an Irvine, California, treatment clinic and education facility for autistic children. He is the founder of Orbitron LP, a global macro long-short hedge fund. He is the founder and president of The Massiah Foundation, a charitable organization..

Life and career

Early life and education
Fariborz Maseeh was born in Tehran, Iran, and arrived in Portland, Oregon in his teens. He graduated from Portland State University (PSU) with a Bachelor of Science degree in engineering with honors in structural engineering. He then graduated from the University of Texas at Austin with a master's degree. While there, he performed research in the Department of Aeronautics. Maseeh then returned to PSU where he earned another master's degree in Applied Mathematics. Maseeh remained in the Portland area and taught engineering courses at Clackamas Community College. After his family life was stabilized, he ventured to Boston to earn a doctorate degree at the Massachusetts Institute of Technology. After receiving his doctorate, Maseeh started working as a Senior Research Scientist at a technology start-up firm in Silicon Valley. He resigned after one year to found IntelliSense.

Technology entrepreneur
Maseeh founded IntelliSense in 1991. IntelliSense was the first company focused on the custom design, development, and manufacturing of next-generation MEMS (microelectromechanical systems) operation and became one of the world's fastest-growing MEMS companies. It was twice named to the New England Technology "Fast 50" and the Forbes' "Fast 500". Maseeh sold IntelliSense in 2000. Following the transaction, Maseeh joined the Corning management team but resigned after a year. Maseeh founded Picoco LLC as well as the Massiah Foundation in 2001.

Investor
Maseeh manages an investment firm, Surlamer Investments, where he manages hedge funds, real estate funds, and educational and entertainment operations.

He has developed and funds a number of new operating businesses for social causes including Kids Institute for Development and Advancement, a school for autistic children in Irvine, California, as well as the Port Theater in Corona del Mar, Newport Beach. Through the Massiah Foundation, Maseeh looks for social causes where his investment creates material change in a community through philanthropic efforts. Since 2000, the Massiah Foundation has funded over $2 million in scholarships for over 300 students from Lawrence High School in Lawrence, Massachusetts.

Community Service 
Maseeh has served on numerous boards, including those of the MIT Corporation and Harvard Medical School Board of Fellows. In April 2021, it was announced that he was elected to the Caltech Board of Trustees. He sits on engineering advisory boards at University of Southern California Viterbi School of Engineering, Massachusetts Institute of Technology, and Portland State University.
Maseeh is also a former Trustee of The Foundation at University of California at Irvine (UCI), former Executive Member of California Council on Science and Technology (CCST), past chairman of the board of directors of Children’s Hospital of Orange County Foundation for Children, and past board member of the Boys and Girls Club of Boston

Philanthropy 
Maseeh actively looks for unique philanthropic venues with large public benefits applying management principles. Through the Massiah Foundation, Maseeh utilizes the concept of venture philanthropy targeting unique opportunities to invest in entities that will have a lasting and significant social impact per invested capital. Selected examples of his philanthropy are listed below:

Massachusetts Institute of Technology 
 Maseeh Hall (2010): The Massiah Foundation donated $24 million to expand the undergraduate student body.
 Maseeh Chair in Emerging Technologies (2003): The Maseeh Chair was held by the Provost and is currently held by Vladimir Bulovic.
 Excellence in Teaching Awards (2002: Department of Civil Engineering)
 Terrascope Program: Freshmen have the chance to couple their research with the crucial visit to a location where they can best learn about all of the issues associated with climate management.
 MITSEED Academy: The Saturday Engineering & Enrichment Discovery Academy is an academic enrichment and career exploration program for students in high school.

Portland State University 
 Fariborz Maseeh Hall (2019): Key funder in the $60 million renovations and renaming of the building which houses the College of Liberal Arts & Sciences, Fariborz Maseeh Department of Mathematics + Statistics, and the Jordan Schnitzer Museum of Art at PSU.
 Maseeh College of Engineering and Computer Science (2004): The Massiah Foundation awarded the largest gift in the history of PSU to support building the Northwest Center for Engineering, naming it Maseeh College of Engineering and Computer Science. It also endows professorships and graduate scholarships. It is the first school to be named after an Iranian American
 Fariborz Maseeh Department of Mathematics and Statistics (2009): Made a philanthropic investment in computational science to increase research and education in large computing and applied fields of Mathematics and Statistics. First Mathematics Department to be named.
 Maseeh Colloquium and Lecture in Mathematics and Statistics
 Maseeh Fellows: Gives graduate student scholarships in engineering.
 Kamelia Massih Outstanding Student and Faculty in the Arts Prize
 Kamelia Massih student Lounge, Donna J. Koch Student Lounge, Dryden Drop Tower, Chik Erzurumlu Scholarships

University of California, Irvine 
 Ferdowsi Presidential Chair in Zoroastrian Studies (2019): The first presidential chair in Zoroastrian Studies in the United States
 Samuel Jordan Center for Persian Studies: First independent campus center in the United States for Persian Studies and Culture
 Endowed chairs:
 Maseeh Chair in Persian Studies and Culture (School of Humanities)
 Maseeh Professor in Persian Performing Arts (Clair Trevor School of the Arts)
 Howard Baskerville Professor of Persian History (School of Humanities)
 Alborz Auditorium: Created challenge grant to name auditorium at the Department of Humanities at UCI (named after the renowned Alborz High School in Tehran, Iran).
 Rollestone Hall (2009): Funded its creation and named after A. A. Rollestone, the main benefactor to the creation of Alborz High
 McCormack Theater (2009): Funded its creation and named it after Nettie Fowler McCormick, benefactor to the creation of Alborz High
 Henry Samueli School of Engineering (2003): Created Maseeh Best Research and Best Teaching Awards
 Various Student Scholarships in Medicine, Athletics; also supports through UCI Medal Ceremony.

University of Southern California 
 USC Maseeh Entrepreneurship Prize Competition (2010)

See also
Maseeh College of Engineering and Computer Science
Iranian Americans
List of Iranian Americans

References

1959 births
Living people
Cockrell School of Engineering alumni
Iranian emigrants to the United States
Massachusetts Institute of Technology alumni
Microelectronic and microelectromechanical systems
People from Tehran
Portland State University alumni